Two ships have been named Mein Schiff 1, 

 launched in 1996, served under this name between 2010 and 2018
 launched in 2018

See also
 TUI Cruises#Fleet

Ship names